Joseph Patrick Niland (died February 18, 2007) is a former American basketball coach and player at Canisius College. Niland played college basketball at Canisius from 1938 to 1942, graduating in 1942 as an All-American. From 1943 to 1945, Niland served under General George S. Patton in the US Army's 20th Armored Division during World War II. Niland was the head basketball coach at Canisius College from 1948 to 1953, compiling an overall record of 76–61. Niland was elected to the Canisius College Sports Hall of Fame in 1964, and the Greater Buffalo Sports Hall of Fame in 2001. He is the father of college coaches Joseph Niland Jr and David Niland and uncle of current University of Michigan men's basketball head coach John Beilein.

Head coaching record

References

Canisius Golden Griffins men's basketball coaches
Year of birth uncertain